Lamme is a river of Lower Saxony, Germany. It flows into the Innerste near Bad Salzdetfurth. In 1945 the river was crossed by Allied Forces.

See also
List of rivers of Lower Saxony

References

Rivers of Lower Saxony
Rivers of Germany